The As Sombreru Pillbox I, As Sombreru Pillbox II, and As Sombreru Pillbox III are three historic defensive fortifications on Guam, near Tumon, that were listed on the U.S. National Register of Historic Places in 1991.  They are pillboxes, a type of defensive fortification, built by the 48th Independent Mixed Brigade; 29th Division of the Imperial Japanese Army during 1941-1944, between Japan capturing Guam on December 8, 1941 from the United States and the U.S. recapturing Guam in 1944.

"As Sombreru Pillbox I" has also known been known as As Sombreru Point Japanese Fortification.  Its precise location is not disclosed by the National Register;  it is listed as "Address Restricted".

Entrance and an air vent come through the east wall. It was built of steel-reinforced concrete including beach rubble, and, as of the NRHP listing date, was in "excellent" condition.

It is not clear whether any of these pillboxes engaged directly in the 1944 battle for Guam.  These pillboxes were clearly designed to repel invaders coming from the sea.  The U.S. invasion beginning on July 21, 1944, however, was further to the south and west;  the area of these pillboxes was over-run by U.S. forces coming from the south, on about August 2, 1944.

See also
National Register of Historic Places listings in Guam

References

Buildings and structures on the National Register of Historic Places in Guam
World War II on the National Register of Historic Places in Guam
1940s establishments in Guam
Tumon, Guam